East Garston is a village and civil parish on the River Lambourn, about  north of Hungerford in West Berkshire. The river flows through the village, dividing many houses from the main road, so that each has a bridge over the river to the front door.

Government
The civil parish of East Garston comprises the village of East Garston, together with a considerable area of rural downland to the north and south. The parish has approximately 226 dwellings. The parish has boundaries with the Berkshire parishes of Fawley, Great Shefford, Hungerford and Lambourn, and with the Oxfordshire parish of Letcombe Bassett.

Notable people
Charles Thomas Wooldridge, murderer and dedicatee of The Ballad of Reading Gaol by Oscar Wilde, was born in the village.

Amenities
The village has a village hall and social club.

Cricket club
The club is a sociable aspect of village life with participation from village residents and others from the surrounding area. The club plays about 20 matches per year.

Bellringers
East Garston Bellringers was re-formed in 1998.

Garston Gallopers
East Garston is the home of the Garston Gallopers, a mixed Morris dancing side.  The Gallopers colours are purple and green, the "village" colours from the school uniform and the racing colours of a prominent racehorse trainer from the village. The emblem is the traditional carousel galloper.  Practice is on Monday evenings in East Garston village hall throughout the year, and new dancers and musicians are always welcome.

Demography

Gallery of images

References

Villages in Berkshire
West Berkshire District
Civil parishes in Berkshire